Mircea Frăţică (born 14 July 1957) is a retired Romanian middleweight judoka who won the European title in 1982. He also won bronze medals at the 1980 European Championships, 1983 World Championships and 1984 Olympics. Between 1976 and 1985 was coached by Clubul Sportiv Nitramonia Fagaras ("Nitramonia Fagras Sports Club") founder and coach, Gheorghe Gujba and he later joined Nitramonia Fagaras as a coach alongside Gujba before moving on to Liberty Oradea where his team won the 1999 European Cup Championship.

References

External links
 

Romanian male judoka
1957 births
Living people
Judoka at the 1980 Summer Olympics
Judoka at the 1984 Summer Olympics
Olympic judoka of Romania
Olympic bronze medalists for Romania
Olympic medalists in judo
Medalists at the 1984 Summer Olympics
20th-century Romanian people
21st-century Romanian people